Renamed in 2021, the Valdez Theatre Conference is an annual conference on American Theatre held in Valdez, Alaska that focuses on playwrighting. Continually held each year since 1993, the conference puts out a call for play submissions, requesting playwrights from around the country to send one-act plays and full-length plays for consideration. Selected plays are read by actors in front of an audience, then each play is critiqued by professionals, academics in theatre, and audience members.

The Conference provides a series of workshops, symposia, theatrical productions, and panels at which participants have the opportunity to study with award-winning playwrights, directors, producers, and actors, as well as scholars and critics. The Call for Plays is the first step toward the conference’s mission to develop new voices and provide students with the opportunity to interact in a workshop setting with some of the greatest luminaries in the American Theatre.

List of notable playwrights honored and attended 
 Edward Albee
 Robert Woodruff Anderson
 Kia Corthron
 Richard Dresser
 Scott Elliott
 Horton Foote
 Gary Garrison
 Jack Gelber
 Jessica Goldberg
 John Guare
 Rand Higbee 
 Arlene Hutton
 Arthur M. Jolly
 Jon Klein
 Sherry Kramer
 Tony Kushner
 Siobhan Gilbert
 Romulus Linney
 Emily Mann
 Terrence McNally
 Scott McMorrow
 Arthur Miller
 Dawson Moore
 Philip Middleton Williams
 August Wilson
 Lanford Wilson
 Paula Vogel
 Y York

List of notable actors honored and attended 
 Angela Bassett
 Frank Collison
 John Heard
 Judd Hirsch
 Laura Linney
 Erin Dagon-Mitchell
 Wayne Mitchell
 Patricia Neal
 Chris Noth
 Lloyd Richards
 Ron Rand
 Marian Seldes
 Libby Skala
 Courtney B. Vance
Stockard Channing

References

External links
 Main Website
 NPR coverage of the conference from 2002
 More info from UAA

1993 establishments in Alaska
Annual events in Alaska
Festivals in Alaska
Recurring events established in 1993
Theatre festivals in the United States
Tourist attractions in Chugach Census Area, Alaska